Hocine Rabet (6 March 1953) was an Algerian professional footballer who played as a midfielder.

Life and career

International
Rabet played only two games with the national team, against Yugoslavia in a friendly match as a substitute, and against East Germany.

Honours

Club
 USM Alger
 Algerian Cup (1): 1980-81

National team
 Football at the Mediterranean Games: 1975

References

External links
 

1953 births
Algerian footballers
Algeria international footballers
People from Annaba Province
Hamra Annaba players
USM Alger players
USM Annaba players
Living people
Association football midfielders
Mediterranean Games gold medalists for Algeria
Mediterranean Games medalists in football
Competitors at the 1975 Mediterranean Games
21st-century Algerian people